The Maritime County was a county centered around the Gdynia and Wejherowo, that existed from 1927 to 1939, and from 1945 to 1951. From 1927 to 1939, it was located in the Pomeranian Voivodeship, in the Second Polish Republic. In 1945, it was located in the Pomeranian Voivodeship, and from 1945 to 1951, it was located in the Gdańsk Voivodeship, which, in 1945 were under the administration of the Provisional Government of the Republic of Poland, from 1945 to 1947, under the administration of the Provisional Government of National Unity, and since 1947, under the administration of the Polish People's Republic. Until 1928, its seat was located in the city of Gdynia, and was since then moved to Wejherowo.

History 
The Maritime County had been established on 1 January 1927, from then-disestablished Puck County, and part of the Wejherowo County. Its seat was located in the city of  Gdynia. It was one of the counties of the Pomeranian Voivodeship of the Second Polish Republic. Upon its creation it become the only county of Poland, to border Baltic Sea, and as such, the only sea access of the country.

On 21 March 1928, the Wejherowo County had been incorporated into the Maritime County, with the exception of the gminas (municipalities) of Linja, Tłuczewo, Niepoczołowice, Zakrzewo, and Kętrzyno, that were incorporated into the Kartuzy County. Additionally, the seat of the county had been transferred from Gdynia to Wejherowo.

On 24 January 1929, the city of Gdynia become a separate city county. In 1931, the Maritime County was inhabited by 79 900 people.

On 15 June 1934, the municipalities of Linja, Tłuczewo, Niepoczołowice, Zakrzewo, and Kętrzyno were transferred from the Kartuzy County to the Maritime County. On 1 August 1934, the single-village rural municipalities were replaced by the multi-village rural municipalities. As such, the county was divided into two cities, that were, Puck and Wejherowo, and 11 municipalities.

On 1 September 1939, the Nazi Germany had invaded Poland, conquering area that included the county. As such it had been replaced by the Maritime District, located within the Region of Danzig, Reichsgau Danzig-West Prussia.

The county had been reestablished in 1945, following the area being reconquered by the Red Army of the Soviet Union, and given under Polish administration of the Provisional Government of the Republic of Poland. Until 7 April 1945, was located within the Pomeranian Voivodeship, when it was incorporated into then-established Gdańsk Voivodeship. On 28 June 1945 the Provisional Government of the Republic of Poland had been replaced by the Provisional Government of National Unity, and on the 19 February 1947, the provisional government was replaced by the Polish People's Republic. In 1946, the county was inhabited by 85 493 people, and in 1947, it had an area of 1281 km2. It existed until 1 July 1951, when it was replaced by the Wejherowo County.

Citations

Notes

References 

Former counties of Poland
Pomeranian Voivodeship (1919–1939)
States and territories established in 1927
States and territories established in 1945
States and territories disestablished in 1939
States and territories disestablished in 1951
1927 establishments in Poland
1945 establishments in Poland
1939 disestablishments in Poland
1951 disestablishments in Poland
History of Pomerania
Puck County
Wejherowo County
Gdynia